In de Gloria ("In the Glory") was a 2000–01 Flemish TV sketch comedy show, directed by Jan Eelen and produced by the company Woestijnvis. It was a mockumentary series which satirized reality television and human interest shows, especially the way regular people are exploited by media.

The show ran on the Belgian public TV channel  Canvas for two seasons of 10 episodes each. In Flanders itself, the series continues to enjoy significant popularity and critical praise, with several sketches having gained classic status. Despite the local popularity, the show has never been exported.

Concept

In de Gloria is a mockumentary in sketch show format. Every episode consists of a series of sketches that are mostly improvised around a central idea. The tone is tragicomical. Eelen based some of the spoof targets on pre-existing TV formats, including some shows of his own company, Woestijnvis. In an interview, Eelen said he was inspired by the Dutch mockumentaries of Van Kooten en De Bie and Arjan Ederveen's 30 minuten.<ref>{{Cite web|url=http://www.standaard.be/cnt/dst22022001_069|title = INTERVIEW.

Cast

 Sien Eggers
 Frank Focketyn
 Kris Focketyn as Jos Vermaelen from Vermaelen projects
 An Miller
 Wim Opbrouck
 Lucas Van den Eynde
 Tania Van der Sanden
 Tom Van Dyck

StatusIn de Gloria has been lauded by TV critics ever since it first aired. In 2002, it received the Prijs van de Vlaamse Radio-en Televisiekritiek for "Best TV Show". It's also popular with viewers. All seasons are available on DVD.

Internet notoriety

"Boemerang" (Boomerang) gained notoriety on YouTube. It features the host of a talk show, "Boemerang", breaking into fits of giggles after hearing the voice of one of his guests, who spoke in a squeaky manner due to a failed tonsillectomy, much the same as Peter Sellers in the Pink Panther dentist sketch. The video uploader who added English subtitles to the footage implied the footage was real and shortened it especially to remove all indications of it being fake. The full sketch shows the TV host in a supposed archive TV show (hence the title Boemerang) looking back on the infamous moment that got him fired in the past. All people in the footage are actors. The show's host, Erik Hartman, is played by Tom Van Dyck; his two guests Valère and Marijke are portrayed by Lucas Van den Eynde and An Miller.

It quickly became an Internet meme among foreigners who mistook it for being real. In September 2006, the YouTube clip was even shown during The Tonight Show with Jay Leno and Star Channel news, with both hosts announcing it as being real.

Part of the Boemerang sketch were also featured in an Argentinian television advertisement for Quilmes beer, titled Risas (laughs''), where Hartman is seen laughing.

References

External links
 
 

Flemish television shows
Belgian television sketch shows
2000 Belgian television series debuts
2001 Belgian television series endings
Belgian mockumentary television series
2000s satirical television series
Belgian comedy television shows
Belgian satirical television shows
Television shows set in Belgium
Film and television memes
Internet memes
Reality television series parodies
Canvas (TV channel) original programming